Jayro Bustamante (born 7 May 1977) is a Guatemalan film director and screenwriter. He directed the 2015 film Ixcanul, which was selected as the Guatemalan entry for the Best Foreign Language Film at the 88th Academy Awards. He was named on the jury for the Best First Feature Award at the 67th Berlin International Film Festival.

Filmography
 Ixcanul - 2015
 Tremors (Temblores) - 2019
 La Llorona - 2019

References

External links

1977 births
Living people
Guatemalan film directors
People from Guatemala City
Guatemalan screenwriters
Male screenwriters
Universidad de San Carlos de Guatemala alumni